Man of Iron is a 1935 American drama film directed by William C. McGann and written by William Wister Haines. The film stars Barton MacLane, Mary Astor, John Eldredge, Dorothy Peterson, Joseph Crehan and Craig Reynolds. The film was released by Warner Bros. on December 21, 1935.

Plot
Steel mill foreman Chris Bennett is pleased when he is chosen to be the new boss of Harrison Balding's entire business over Ed Tanahill, who is the owner's cousin. Tanahill and secretary Vida conspire to sabotage Chris's progress at the mill reputation with the men.

The hard-working and popular Chris now neglects the mill and incurs the wrath of his workers while wife Bessie rues the absence of their old friends. He finally comes to his senses and returns to his old position as foreman before it's too late.

Cast     
Barton MacLane as Chris Bennett
Mary Astor as Vida
John Eldredge as Ed Tanahill
Dorothy Peterson as Bessie Bennett
Joseph Crehan as Tom Martin
Craig Reynolds as Mr. Harry Adams
Joe Sawyer as Crawford 
Joe King as Harrison Balding 
John Qualen as Collins 
Wild Bill Elliott as Charlie Fagan 
Florence Fair as Mrs. Balding
Edward Keane as Mortgage Man

References

External links 
 

1935 films
Warner Bros. films
American drama films
1935 drama films
Films directed by William C. McGann
American black-and-white films
1930s English-language films
1930s American films
Films scored by Bernhard Kaun